Peter Andrew Capes (born 26 February 1962) is an Australian businessman and former cricketer. He has been the CEO of the Subiaco Football Club in the West Australian Football League (WAFL) since 2010.

Cricket career
Educated at Melville Senior High School, Capes was a left-arm fast-medium bowler for Western Australia, taking 124 wickets in 40 first-class games. His best innings figures were 6 for 92 in Western Australia's victory over the touring Pakistan team in December 1989. He had taken five wickets in each innings against Tasmania the previous January. He also played for the Prime Minister's XI in 1987.

Business career
After graduating with a Bachelor of Administration degree from Curtin University of Technology, Capes worked in the fields of human resource management and business development with Murdoch University, serving as an associate director, and Australian Quarantine and Inspection Service. He served on the West Australian cricket selection panel for two seasons between 2003 and 2005 before being appointed the CEO of East Fremantle Football Club in 2005. He left the club in 2010, and was appointed CEO of Subiaco in June 2010.

References

1962 births
Living people
Australian chief executives
Australian cricketers
People educated at Melville Senior High School
Curtin University alumni
East Fremantle Football Club administrators
Cricketers from Fremantle
Subiaco Football Club administrators
Western Australia cricketers